Ángel R. Cabada is a town (villa) in the Mexican state of Veracruz. Located in the state's Papaloapan River region, it serves as the municipal seat for the surrounding municipality of the same name.

In the 2005 INEGI Census, the town reported a total population of 11,689.

The town is named after Ángel Rosario Cabada (1872-1921), an agrarian leader. Previously, the town was named El Mesón. El Mesón had been a small regional center of the Olmec or Epi-Olmec culture during a period between 400 BCE and 100 CE. Local farmers found the El Mesón Stela in the 1950s.  (Tres Zapotes, about 15 km south of El Mesón, was part of the Olmec heartland.)

References

External links
 Map of Ángel R. Cabada municipality by the Veracruz State Office of Information for Sustainable Rural Development (Oeidrus). 
 Depiction of the El Mesón Stela and the municipality coat of arms derived from the stela. 

Populated places in Veracruz
Archaeological sites in Veracruz
Olmec sites
Epi-Olmec culture